Boron can be prepared in several crystalline and amorphous forms. Well known crystalline forms are α-rhombohedral (α-R), β-rhombohedral (β-R), and β-tetragonal (β-T).  In special circumstances, boron can also be synthesized in the form of its α-tetragonal (α-T) and γ-orthorhombic (γ) allotropes. Two amorphous forms, one a finely divided powder and the other a glassy solid, are also known. Although at least 14 more allotropes have been reported, these other forms are based on tenuous evidence or have not been experimentally confirmed, or are thought to represent mixed allotropes, or boron frameworks stabilized by impurities. Whereas the β-rhombohedral phase is the most stable and the others are metastable, the transformation rate is negligible at room temperature, and thus all five phases can exist at ambient conditions. Amorphous powder boron and polycrystalline β-rhombohedral boron are the most common forms. The latter allotrope is a very hard grey material, about ten percent lighter than aluminium and with a melting point (2080 °C) several hundred degrees higher than that of steel.

Elemental boron has been found in star dust and meteorites, but does not exist in the high oxygen environment of Earth. It is difficult to extract from its compounds. The earliest methods involved reduction of boric oxide with metals such as magnesium or aluminium. However, the product is almost always contaminated with metal borides. Pure boron can be prepared by reducing volatile boron halides with hydrogen at high temperatures. Very pure boron, for use in the semiconductor industry, is produced by the decomposition of diborane at high temperatures, followed by purification via zone melting or the Czochralski process. Even more difficult to prepare are single crystals of pure boron phases, due to polymorphism and the tendency  of boron to react with impurities; typical crystal size is ~0.1 mm.

Summary of properties

α-rhombohedral boron
α-rhombohedral boron has a unit cell of twelve boron atoms. The structure consists of  icosahedra in which each boron atom has five nearest neighbors within the icosahedron. If the bonding were the conventional covalent type then each boron would have donated five electrons. However, boron has only three valence electrons, and it is thought that the bonding in the  icosahedra is achieved by the so-called 3-center electron-deficient bonds where the electron charge is accumulated at the center of a triangle formed by three adjacent atoms.

The isolated  icosahedra are not stable, due to the nonuniformity of the honeycomb; thus boron is not a molecular solid, but the icosahedra in it are connected by strong covalent bonds.

α-tetragonal boron
Pure α-tetragonal can only be synthesized as thin layers deposited on an underlying substrate of isotropic boron carbide (B50C2) or nitride (B50N2). Most examples of α-tetragonal boron are in fact boron-rich carbide or nitrides.

β-rhombohedral boron
β-rhombohedral boron has a unit cell containing 105–108 (ideally exactly 105) atoms. Most atoms form B12 discrete icosahedra; a few form partially interpenetrating icosahedra, and there are two deltahedral B10 units, and a single central B atom. For a long time, it was unclear whether the α or β phase is most stable at ambient conditions; however, gradually a consensus was reached that the β phase is the most thermodynamically stable allotrope.

β-tetragonal boron
The β phase was produced in 1960 by hydrogen reduction of BBr3 on hot tungsten, rhenium or tantalum filaments at temperatures 1270–1550 °C (i.e. chemical vapor deposition). Further studies have reproduced the synthesis and confirmed the absence of impurities in this phase.

γ-boron

The γ-phase can be described as a NaCl-type arrangement of two types of clusters, B12 icosahedra and B2 pairs. It can be produced by compressing other boron phases to 12–20 GPa and heating to 1500–1800 °C, and remains stable at ambient conditions. There is evidence of significant charge transfer from B2 pairs to the B12 icosahedra in this structure; in particular, lattice dynamics suggests the presence of significant long-range electrostatic interactions.

This phase was reported by Wentorf in 1965; however, neither structure nor chemical composition were established. The structure was solved using ab initio crystal structure prediction calculations and confirmed using single crystal X-ray diffraction.

Cubic boron
Sullenger et al. (1969) and McConville et al. (1976) reported a cubic allotrope of boron, obtained in argon plasma experiments, with a unit cell of 1705±3 atoms and a density of 2.367 g/cm3. While this allotrope is occasionally mentioned in the literature, no subsequent work appears to have been published either confirming or discrediting its existence. Donohue (1982) commented that the number of atoms in the unit cell did not appear to be icosahedrally related (the icosahedron being a motif common to boron structures).

High-pressure superconducting phase
Compressing boron above 160 GPa produces a boron phase with an as yet unknown structure. Contrary to other phases, which are semiconductors, this phase is a metal and becomes a superconductor with a critical temperature increasing from 6 K at 160 GPa to 11 K at 250 GPa. This structural transformation occurs at pressures at which theory predicts the icosahedra will dissociate. Speculation as to the structure of this phase has included face-centred cubic (analogous to Al); α-Ga, and body-centred tetragonal (analogous to In). It has also been suggested that the nonmetal-metal transition is simply the result of a band gap closure, as occurs with iodine, rather than a structural transition.

Borophene 
There exist several two-dimensional forms of boron (together called borophenes), and even more are predicted theoretically.

Borospherene

The discovery of the quasispherical allotropic molecule borospherene (B40) was announced in July 2014.

Amorphous boron
Amorphous boron contains B12 regular icosahedra that are randomly bonded to each other without long range order. Pure amorphous boron can be produced by thermal decomposition of diborane at temperatures below 1000 °C. Annealing at 1000 °C converts amorphous boron to β-rhombohedral boron. Amorphous boron nanowires (30–60 nm thick) or fibers can be produced by magnetron sputtering and laser-assisted chemical vapor deposition, respectively; and they also convert to β-rhombohedral boron nanowires upon annealing at 1000 °C.

Notes

References

Bibliography

External links
 

 
Boron